Éva Botond (27 May 1921 – 30 December 1976) was a Hungarian figure skater. She competed in the ladies' singles event at the 1936 Winter Olympics.

References

External links
 

1921 births
1976 deaths
Hungarian female single skaters
Olympic figure skaters of Hungary
Figure skaters at the 1936 Winter Olympics
Figure skaters from Budapest